Frank Leigh (18 April 1876 – 9 May 1948) was a British stage and film actor.

Biography
Born in London in 1876, Leigh settled in Hollywood and became a leading man during the silent era. Following the introduction of sound, his roles were much less significant. By the late 1930s all his screen appearances were uncredited. He died in Los Angeles in 1948.

Selected filmography

 On Dangerous Ground (1917)
 Life's Whirlpool (1917)
 Stolen Orders (1918)
 Crown Jewels (1918)
 All of a Sudden Norma (1919)
 The Homebreaker (1919)
 Common Property (1919)
 Her Buckskin Knight (1919)
 Lord and Lady Algy (1919)
 A Regular Fellow (1919)
 Dangerous Days (1920)
 The Cup of Fury (1920)
 The Mother of His Children (1920)
 Nurse Marjorie (1920)
 Help Wanted - Male (1920)
 Pilgrims of the Night (1921)
 The Light in the Clearing (1921)
 Out of the Silent North (1922)
 Truxton King (1923)
 The Gentleman from America (1923)
 Ashes of Vengeance (1923)
 Rosita (1923)
 The Reckless Age (1924)
 The Breath of Scandal (1924)
 As Man Desires (1925)
 His Majesty, Bunker Bean (1925)
 The Winding Stair (1925)
 The Adorable Deceiver (1926)
 Flame of the Argentine (1926)
 Secret Orders (1926)
 The Impostor (1926)
 The Lady of the Harem (1926)
 The Flaming Forest (1926)
 The Tigress (1927)
 Somewhere in Sonora (1927)
 Mockery (1927)
 A Night of Mystery (1928)
 Love in the Desert (1929)
 Montmartre Rose (1929)
 The Thirteenth Chair (1929)
 Lotus Lady (1930)
 Ten Nights in a Barroom (1931)
 The Woman from Monte Carlo (1932)
 Kiss of Araby (1933)
 The Spanish Cape Mystery (1935)
 The Amazing Exploits of the Clutching Hand (1936)
 The Legion of Missing Men (1937)
 The Black Swan (1942)

References

Bibliography
 Goble, Alan. The Complete Index to Literary Sources in Film. Walter de Gruyter, 1999.

External links

1876 births
1948 deaths
British male film actors
British male stage actors
British emigrants to the United States
Male actors from London